Marinos Sizopoulos (born 17 July 1957 in Nicosia) is a Cypriot politician and the current president of the Movement for Social Democracy (EDEK) party. From 2003 until 2011, he served as a member of the House of Representatives. On 1 March 2015, he was elected president of the Movement for Social Democracy (EDEK), following the resignation of Yiannakis Omirou. He is the Chairman of the Committee of the House of Representatives for the investigation of the Cyprus Problem ("File of Cyprus").

References

1957 births
Living people
Aristotle University of Thessaloniki alumni
Cypriot physicians
Movement for Social Democracy politicians
Leaders of political parties in Cyprus
Members of the House of Representatives (Cyprus)
People from Nicosia